Fitz is a small village in Shropshire, England. It is close to the River Severn, downstream from Montford Bridge and upstream of Shelton, near Shrewsbury, in the civil parish of Pimhill.

Fitz has a red brick church named for Saint Peter and Saint Paul, built in 1722 and restored in 1915 by Sir Aston Webb.  Eighteenth-century mathematician Edward Waring is buried in the churchyard.

Fitz Manor, which dates at the oldest to about 1450, is run as a bed and breakfast establishment and is grade II listed building.

See also
Listed buildings in Pimhill

References

External links

Villages in Shropshire
Shrewsbury and Atcham